Tinogasta is a city in the west of the , on the right-hand shore of the Abaucán River, about 280 km from the provincial capital San Fernando del Valle de Catamarca. It is the head town of the department of the same name. The name of the city comes from the Kakana words tino ("meeting") and gasta ("town").

Tinogasta is a tourist site. It has access to the mountains for adventure tourism, hot springs, and archaeological museums. The basis of the local economy is agriculture, focused on vine.

Climate
The Köppen Climate Classification subtype for this climate is "BSk". (Tropical and Subtropical Steppe Climate).

References

External links
 
 Departamento Tinogasta
 WelcomeArgentina.com

Populated places in Catamarca Province
Cities in Argentina
Argentina